Pomasia lacunaria is a moth in the family Geometridae. It is found on Borneo and Peninsular Malaysia. The habitat consists of lowland forests.

The length of the forewings is about 8 mm.

References

Moths described in 1997
Eupitheciini